A root ball is the main mass of roots at the base of a plant such as a shrub or tree.  It is of particular significance in horticulture when plants are repotted or planted out in the ground.  The quality and preparation of the root ball will determine how well the plant will survive this transplantation and then flourish in its new situation.

References

Horticulture